Sayyid Jamāl al-Dīn al-Afghānī (Pashto/), also known as Sayyid Jamāl ad-Dīn Asadābādī and commonly known as Al-Afghani (1838/1839 – 9 March 1897), was a political activist and Islamic ideologist who travelled throughout the Muslim world during the late 19th century. He is one of the founders of Islamic Modernism as well as an advocate of Pan-Islamic unity in Europe and Hindu–Muslim unity in India against the British, he has been described as having been less interested in minor differences in Islamic jurisprudence than he was in organizing a united response to Western pressure. He is also known for his involvement with his follower Mirza Reza Kermani in the successful plot to assassinate Shah Naser-al-Din, whom Afghani considered to be making too many concessions to foreign powers, especially the British Empire.

Early life and origin
As indicated by his nisba, al-Afghani claimed to be of Afghan origin. His true national and sectarian background have been a subject of controversy. According to one theory and his own account, he was born in Asadābād, near Kabul, in Afghanistan. Another theory, championed by Nikki R. Keddie and accepted by a number of modern scholars, holds that he was born and raised in a Shia family in Asadabad, near Hamadan, in Iran. Supporters of the latter theory view his claim to an Afghan origin as motivated by a desire to gain influence among Sunni Muslims or escape oppression by the Iranian ruler Nāṣer ud-Dīn Shāh. One of his main rivals, the sheikh Abū l-Hudā, called him Mutaʾafghin ("the one who claims to be Afghan") and tried to expose his Shia roots. Keddie also asserts that al-Afghānī used and practiced taqīa and ketmān, ideas more prevalent in the Iranian Shiʿite world.

He was educated first at home and then taken by his father for further education to Qazvin, to Tehran, and finally, while he was still a youth, to the Shi'a shrine cities in present-day Iraq (then-part of Ottoman Empire). It is thought that followers of Shia revivalist Shaikh Ahmad Ahsa'i had an influence on him. Other names adopted by Al-Afghani were al-Kābulī ("[the one] from Kabul") Asadabadi, Sadat-e Kunar ("Sayyids of Kunar") and Hussain. Especially in his writings published in Afghanistan, he also used the pseudonym ar-Rūmī ("the Roman" or "the Anatolian").

Political activism
At the age of 17 or 18 in 1856–57, Al-Afghani travelled to British India and spent a number of years there studying religions. In 1859, a British spy reported that Al-Afghani was a possible Russian agent. The British representatives reported that he wore traditional cloths of Noghai Turks in Central Asia and spoke Persian, Arabic and Turkish fluently. After this first Indian tour, he decided to perform Hajj or pilgrimage at Mecca. His first documents are dated from Autumn of 1865, where he mentions leaving the "revered place" (makān-i musharraf) and arriving in Tehran around mid-December of the same year. In the spring of 1866 he left Iran for Afghanistan, passing through Mashad and Herat.
 He was spotted in Afghanistan in 1866 and spent time in Qandahar, Ghazni, and Kabul. Reports from the colonial British Indian and Afghan government stated that he was a stranger in Afghanistan, and spoke the Persian language with an Iranian accent and followed European lifestyle more than that of Muslims, not observing Ramadan or other Muslim rites. He became a counselor to Mohammad Afzal Khan, the eldest son of the former Amir, during his war against his half-brother Sher Ali Khan. He encouraged Muhammad Afzal to turn away from his father's British-aligned policy and turn to the Russians for support. In 1868, Sher Ali Khan prevailed against Muhammad Afzal and expelled al-Afghani from the country.

He traveled to Constantinople, passing through India and Cairo on his way there. He stayed in Cairo long enough to meet a young student who would become a devoted disciple of his, Muhammad 'Abduh. Once at Constantinople, he met with Grand Vizier Mehmed Emin Âli Pasha and secured an appointment to the Council of Education. He spoke at the opening of Istanbul University, giving a speech typifying the Modernist spirit animating the ongoing Tanzimat Reforms. "Are we not going to take an example from the civilized nations? Let us cast a glance at the achievement of others. By effort they have achieved the final degree of knowledge and the peak of elevation. For us too all the means are ready, and there remains no obstacle to our progress. Only laziness, stupidity, and ignorance are obstacles to [our] advance. However, conservative clerics found his views too radical. The university was closed in 1871 and al-Afghani was expelled.  He then moved to Egypt and began preaching his ideas of political reform. The Egyptian government originally gave him a stipend, but due to his public attacks on France and England, he was exiled to India in August 1879, where he stayed in Hyderabad and Calcutta. He then traveled to Constantinople, London, Paris, Moscow, St. Petersburg and Munich.

While in Egypt, Afghani sought the removal of the ruling regime of Khedive Ismail which he viewed as pro-British and used Freemasonry as an organizational base for his political activities. During this period, Afghani had also considered assassinating Khedive Ismail. He perceived freemasonry as a means of advancing his anti-colonial, anti-imperialist, pan-Islamic causes. Afghani's political activities would play a decisive role in overthrowing Ismail Pasha from the throne and bringing Tawfiq Pasha as the Khedive. 

However, local Masons asserted that they were not interested in politics and sought reconciliation to the British empire. When Afghani was warned that the lodge was not a political platform, he replied:"I have seen a lot of odd things in this country [Egypt], but I would never have thought that cowardice would infiltrate the ranks of masonry to such an extent". Roughly around 1875-1876, an incident wherein Masons lavishly praised a British imperial visitor was a major reason for Afghani's quitting of Freemasonry. After realising the indifference of the Masons and their political subservience to the British empire, Afghani eventually left Freemasonry.

In 1884, he began publishing an Arabic newspaper in Paris entitled al-Urwah al-Wuthqa ("The Indissoluble Link") with Muhammad Abduh; the title (Arabic: العروة الوثقى), sometimes translated as "The Strongest Bond", is taken from Quran 2:256. The newspaper called for a return to the original principles and ideals of Islam, and for greater unity among Islamic peoples. He argued that this would allow the Islamic community to regain its former strength against European powers.

When Al-Afgani was visiting Bushehr in southern Iran in the spring of 1886, planning to pick up books he had shipped there and carry on to Russia, he fell ill. He was invited by Shah Nasser ad-Din's Minister of Press and Publications to come to Tehran, but fell from favor quite quickly and the Shah asked him to be taken to Russia, where Al-Afghani spent 1887 to 1889.

From Russia he traveled to Munich and returned to Iran in late 1889. Due to his political activities, the Shah planned to expel him from Iran, but Al-Afghani found out and took sanctuary in the Shah Abdol-Azim shrine near Tehran. After seven months of preaching to admirers from the shrine, he was arrested in 1891, transported to the border with Ottoman Mesopotamia, and evicted from Iran. Although Al-Afghani quarrelled with most of his patrons, it is said he "reserved his strongest hatred for the Shah," whom he accused of weakening Islam by granting concessions to Europeans and squandering the money earned thereby. His agitation against the Shah is thought to have been one of the "fountain-heads" of the successful 1891 protest against the granting a tobacco monopoly to a British company, and the later 1905 Constitutional Revolution.

After Iraq, he went to England in 1891 and 1892. He was later invited by a member of Abdulhamid II's court in 1892 to Istanbul. He traveled there with diplomatic immunity from the British Embassy, which raised many eyebrows, but nevertheless was granted a house and salary by the Sultan. Abdulhamid II's aim was to use Al-Afghani for Pan Islamism propagation.

While in Istanbul in 1895, Al-Afghani was visited by a Persian ex-prisoner, Mirza Reza Kermani (who had been a servant and disciple of Al-Afghani), and together they planned the assassination of the Shah, Naser-al-Din. They both collaborated with Mirza Malkam Khan, former Qajar envoy to London, in his London-based paper Qanun to attack Qajar rule. Kermani later returned to Iran, and assassinated Naser-al-Din at gunpoint on 1 May 1896, while the Shah was visiting the same shrine Al-Afghani had once taken refuge in. Kermani was executed by public hanging in August 1897, but the Iranian government was not successful in extraditing Al-Afghani from Turkey. Al-Afghani himself died of cancer in the same year.

Political and religious views
Al-Afghani's ideology has been described as a welding of "traditional" religious antipathy toward non-Muslims "to a modern critique of Western imperialism and an appeal for the unity of Islam", urging the adoption of Western sciences and institutions that might strengthen Islam. According to Muhammad Abduh, Al-Afghani's main struggle in life was to decrease British domination of eastern nations and to minimize its power over Muslims.

Al-Afghani's friend, the British poet and Arabophile Wilfrid Scawen Blunt, considered him a liberal, and in some of his writings he equates the parliamentary system to the shura (consultation) system mentioned in the Qur'an. However, his attitude to constitutional government was ambiguous because he doubted that it was viable in the Islamic world. According to his biographer, he envisioned instead "the overthrow of individual rulers who were lax or subservient to foreigners, and their replacement by strong and patriotic men."

Blunt, Jane Digby and Sir Richard Burton, were close with Abdul Qadir al Jazairi (1808–1883), an Algerian Islamic scholar, Sufi and military leader. In 1864, the Lodge "Henry IV" extended an invitation to him to join Freemasonry, which he accepted, being initiated at the Lodge of the Pyramids in Alexandria, Egypt. Blunt had supposedly become a convert to Islam under the influence of al-Afghani, and shared his hopes of establishing an Arab Caliphate based in Mecca to replace the Ottoman Sultan in Istanbul. When Blunt visited Abdul Qadir in 1881, he decided that he was the most promising candidate for "Caliphate," an opinion shared by Afghani and his disciple, Mohammed Abduh.

According to another source Al-Afghani was greatly disappointed by the failure of the Indian Mutiny and came to three principal conclusions from it:
 that European imperialism, having conquered India, now threatened the Middle East.
 that Asia, including the Middle East, could prevent the onslaught of Western powers only by immediately adopting the modern technology like the West.
 that Islam, despite its traditionalism, was an effective creed for mobilizing the public against the imperialists.

Al-Afghani held that Hindus and Muslims should work together to overthrow British rule in India, a view rehashed by Maulana Syed Husain Ahmad Madani in Composite Nationalism and Islam five decades later.

He believed that Islam and its revealed law were compatible with rationality and, thus, Muslims could become politically unified while still maintaining their faith based on a religious social morality. These beliefs had a profound effect on Muhammad Abduh, who went on to expand on the notion of using rationality in the human relations aspect of Islam (mu'amalat).

In 1881 he published a collection of polemics titled Al-Radd 'ala al-Dahriyyi (Refutation of the Materialists), agitating for pan-Islamic unity against Western imperialism. It included one of the earliest pieces of Islamic thought arguing against Darwin's then-recent On the Origin of Species; however, his arguments allegedly incorrectly caricatured evolution, provoking criticism that he had not read Darwin's writings. In his later work Khatirat Jamal ad-Din al-Afghani ("The memoir of Al-Afghani"), he accepted the validity of evolution, asserting that the Islamic world had already known and used it. Although he accepted abiogenesis and the evolution of animals, he rejected the theory that the human species is the product of evolution, arguing that humans have souls.

Among the reasons why Al-Afghani was thought to have had a less than deep religious faith was his lack of interest in finding theologically common ground between Shia and Sunni (despite the fact that he was very interested in political unity between the two groups). For example, when he moved to Istanbul he disguised his Shi'i background by labeling himself "the Afghan".

Death and legacy

Al-Afghani died of cancer of the jaw on 9 March 1897 in Istanbul and was buried there. In late 1944, on the request of the Afghan government, his remains were taken to Afghanistan via British India. His funeral was offered in Peshawar's Qissa Khwani Bazaar in front of the Afghan Consulate building. Thereafter, his remains were laid in Kabul inside the Kabul University; a mausoleum was also erected there in his memory. In October 2002, the American Ambassador to Afghanistan, Robert Finn, pledged a donation of $25000 to restore the mausoleum from damage sustained during the civil war.  The repairs were completed in 2010.

In Afghanistan, a university is named after him (Syed Jamaluddin Afghan University) in Kabul. There is also street in the center of Kabul which is called by the name Afghani. In other parts of Afghanistan, there are many places like hospitals, schools, Madrasas, Parks, and roads named Jamaluddin Afghan.

In Peshawar, Pakistan there is a road named after him as well.

In Tehran, the capital of Iran, there is a square and a street named after him (Asad Abadi Square and "Asad Abadi Avenue" in Yusef Abad)

Theosophy
According to K. Paul Johnson, in The Masters Revealed, H.P. Blavatsky's masters were actually real people, and "Serapis Bey" was Jamal Afghani, as a purported leader of an order named the "Brotherhood of Luxor". Afghani was introduced to the Star of the East Lodge, of which he became the leader, by its founder Raphael Borg, British consul in Cairo, who was in communication with Blavatsky. Afghani's friend, a Jewish-Italian actor from Cairo named James Sanua, who with his girlfriend Lydia Pashkov and their friend Lady Jane Digby were travel companions of Blavatsky. As concluded by Joscelyn Godwin in The Theosophical Enlightenment, "If we interpret the 'Brotherhood of Luxor' to refer to the coterie of esotericists and magicians that Blavatsky knew and worked with in Egypt, then we should probably count Sanua and Jamal ad-Din as members."

In the early 1860s, he was in Central Asia and the Caucasus when Blavatsky was in Tbilisi. In the late 1860s he was in Afghanistan until he was expelled and returned to India. He went to Istanbul and was again expelled in 1871, when he proceeded to Cairo, where his circle of disciples was similar to Blavatsky's Brotherhood of Luxor. Afghani was forced to leave Egypt and settled in Hyderabad, India, in 1879, the year the Theosophical Society's founders arrived in Bombay. He then left India and spent a short time in Egypt before arriving in Paris in 1884. The following year he proceeded to London, and then on to Russia where he collaborated with Blavatsky's publisher, Mikhail Katkov.

Works
 "Sayyid Jamāl-ad-Dīn al-Afghānī:", Continued the statement in the history of Afghans Egypt, original in Arabic: تتمة البيان في تاريخ الأفغان  Tatimmat al-bayan fi tarikh al-Afghan, 1901 (Mesr, 1318 Islamic lunar year (calendar)
 Sayyid Jamāl-ad-Dīn al-Afghānī: Brochure about Naturalism or materialism, original in Dari language: رساله نیچریه (Ressalah e Natscheria) translator of Muhammad Abduh in Arabic.

See also
 Tobacco Protest
 Muhammad Bakhit al-Muti'i
 Mustafa Sabri

Notes
. Some western academics point out that the term "Pan-Islamism" never existed before al-Afghani. The Arabic term Ummah, which is found in the Quran, however was historically used to denote the Muslim nation altogether, surpassing race, ethnicity etc. and this term has been used in a political sense by classical Islamic scholars e.g. such as al-Mawardi in Ahkam al-Sultaniyyah, where he discusses the contract of Imamate of the Ummah, "prescribed to succeed Prophethood" in protection of the religion and of managing the affairs of the world.

References

Further reading
Bashiri, Iraj, Bashiri Working Papers on Central Asia and Iran, 2000.

External links

Jamal-al-Din Afghani, a comprehensive article in Encyclopædia Iranica.

Nahda
1838 births
1897 deaths
Iranian activists
Muslim activists
People of the Persian Constitutional Revolution
Iranian emigrants to the Ottoman Empire
Hashemite people
Iranian expatriates in Afghanistan
Indian independence activists
Iranian Muslim activists
Egyptian Freemasons
Iranian Freemasons
Muslim socialists